is a former Japanese football player.

Playing career
Daichi Okumiya played for Honda Lock and FC Ryukyu from 2011 to 2015. After two years with FC Amawari in the Okinawa Prefectural League, he joined back FC Ryukyu.

Club statistics
Updated to 22 February 2018.

References

External links
Profile at FC Ryukyu

1988 births
Living people
University of Teacher Education Fukuoka alumni
Association football people from Kagoshima Prefecture
Japanese footballers
J3 League players
Japan Football League players
Honda Lock SC players
FC Ryukyu players
Association football defenders